Cresswell's Local and other Songs, Recitations, Etc.  1883 (or to give it is's full title – "Local and other Songs, Recitations, Etc Composed by Marshall Cresswell, Dudley, Northumberland. With Introductory Autobiography (second edition) Illustrated by J. W. Marcke. Newcastle-upon-Tyne. J. W. Chater 61 & 62 Grainger Street, West, 21, Collingwood Street, 89, Clayton Street, and "Cross House", Westgate Road and all Booksellers 1883"  is a Chapbook of Geordie folk song consisting of over 100 pages, published in 1883.

The publication 
Marshall Cresswell wrote all the songs and a set of the original documents are retained in the archives of Border History Museum, Hexham.

The front cover of the book was as thus :-

LOCAL AND OTHER<br/ >
SONGS, RECITATIONS, <br/ >
ETC<br/ >
COMPOSED BY<br/ >
MARSHALL CRESSWELL<br/ >
DUDLEY, NORTHUMBERLAND<br/ >
WITH<br/ >
INTRODUCTORY AUTOBIOGRAPHY<br/ >
(SECOND EDITION) <br/ >
ILLUSTRATED BY J. W. MARCKE<br/ >

NEWCASTLE-UPON-TYNE<br/ >
J. W. CHATER 61 & 62 GRAINGER STREET, WEST<br/ >
21, COLLINGWOOD STREET<br/ >
89, CLAYTON STREET, AND<br/ >
"CROSS HOUSE", WESTGATE ROAD<br/ >
AND ALL BOOKSELLERS<br/ >

1883

Contents 
are as below :-<br/ >

See also 
 Geordie dialect words
 Marshall Cresswell

References

External links
 FARNE – Folk Archive Resource North East – front cover
 Allan’s Illustrated Edition of Tyneside songs and readings – page 512

English folk songs
Songs related to Newcastle upon Tyne
Northumbrian folklore
Chapbooks